Democratic Congress Kerala, is a political party in Kerala, India, formed after the split in Nationalist Congress Party in Kerala. It is led by Mani C. Kappan.

Formation
Mani C. Kappan and his Nationalist Congress Party were part of the ruling Left Democratic Front alliance in Kerala. After rumours that the LDF was planning to give Kappan's sitting seat to Kerala Congress (M), Kappan decided to leave the alliance. He initially claimed that he had the support of the party leadership and the party was planning to leave LDF and join the United Democratic Front. However, the party's state and national leadership decided to continue with the LDF and hence Kappan decided to float a new party in 2021 February.

Electoral Victory
Mani C Kappan, the Nationalist Congress Kerala candidate in the Pala Constituency had a smooth and sharp victory over his rival, Jose K Mani, of the Kerala Congress (M) with a margin of 15,378 votes.

References

Political parties in Kerala
2021 establishments in Kerala